Pathanay Khan or Pathane Khan (Urdu: پٹھانے خان ; born Ghulam Mohammad; 1926 – 2000) was a legendary Saraiki folk singer from Pakistan. He mostly sang Kafis or Ghazals (in Saraiki), usually drawing on the Sufi poetry of Khwaja Ghulam Farid and Shah Hussain. He was born in 1926 in the village Basti Tambu Wali, situated in the heart of the Thal Desert, several miles from Kot Addu, (Punjab).

Story behind the name 
When he was only a few years old, his father brought his third wife to the family home, so his mother decided to leave his father. She took her young son along and went to Kot Addu to stay with her father. When the boy fell seriously ill, his mother took him to a 'syed's' house (a spiritual leader's house). The syed's wife looked after him, and advised his mother to change the boy's name because it seemed 'spiritually too heavy' for him. Syed's wife's daughter commented that he looked like Pathana (in that region, a name symbolising love and valour), and so from that day onwards, he was known as 'Pathanay Khan'. His mother credited the new name for saving the child's life.

Early life 
Pathanay Khan was very attached to his mother. She took good care of him and tried to get him educated. However, he, like his father Khameesa Khan, spent his time wandering, contemplating and singing. His inherent nature lured him away from school after the seventh standard or grade class in his high school. He began singing, mostly the Kafis of Khwaja Ghulam Farid, the saint of Mithankot. His first teacher was Baba Mir Khan, who taught him everything he knew. Singing alone did not earn him enough, so the young Pathanay Khan started collecting firewood for his mother, who used to make bread for the villagers as a village baker. This enabled the family to earn a very modest living. It is said that remembering those days brought tears to his eyes and he believed that it was his love for God, music, and Khwaja Ghulam Farid that gave him strength to bear the burden. Pathanay Khan adopted singing as a profession in earnest after his mother's death. His singing had the capacity to bewitch his listeners, and he could sing for hours on end.

Pathanay Khan was totally devoted to Khwaja Farid. He gave his own deeper meaning to Khwaja Sahib's poetry through his typical style of spirited singing. For example, Khwaja Farid's kafi "Piloo pakian ni vay" has been sung by Suraiya Multanikar, Hussain Bakhsh Dhadhi and many others. Suraiya Multanikar's composition presents it as a light folk song, while Hussain Bakhsh Dhadhi presents it as a classical piece decorated by his unique 'taans' in the style of classical music singer Ashiq Ali Khan.  However, Pathanay Khan's version of this kafi brings a deeper cosmic meaning to it. On the death anniversary of Pathanay Khan in 2016, folk icon Shaukat Ali recalled that Pathanay Khan gave a new dimension to folk music in Pakistan by introducing his specific style of singing kafis and 'sufiana kalaam'.

In 1976, Zulfikar Ali Bhutto, then prime minister of Pakistan, invited him to Islamabad for a private performance. When Pathanay Khan sang "Jindarri lutti tain yaar sajan, Kadi mor maharan tay wal a watan", Bhutto broke into tears. After the programme, the prime minister asked Pathanay Khan three times if he had any 'wish' to make that the Prime Minister could then fulfill.  Each time the singer's reply was, "Bhutto Sahib, aap ko gharib awaam ki parat ho" (Bhutto Sahib, take care of the poor). At this, Bhutto hugged Pathanay Khan and said "I will surely take care of the poor".

Popular hits on television
"Chheena een chhaneeda yaar"
"Meda ishq vee toon"
"Peelu pakkian nee"
"Jindari lutti"
"Kia haal sunanwan dil da, koi mehram yaar na milda"
 Ghoom Charakhreya, Teri Kattan Wali Jeevay

Albums

Awards and recognition
 Pride of Performance Award in 1979 by the President of Pakistan.

Death 
Pathanay Khan died after a protracted illness at his native town of Kot Addu on Thursday 9 March 2000. His funeral was attended by a large number of people including poets, intellectuals, lawyers, educationalists and district officials. He was buried in his native graveyard in Kot Addu.

See also
Mai Bhaghi
Mansoor Malangi
Attaullah Khan Esakhelvi

References

External links
Pathane Khan on BBC Music website

1926 births
2000 deaths
Pakistani classical singers
Pakistani folk singers
People from Muzaffargarh District
Punjabi people
Punjabi singers
20th-century singers
Recipients of the Pride of Performance
Performers of Sufi music